Maestro is the third studio album by Norwegian alternative rock group Kaizers Orchestra. It was released on 15 August 2005 by Kaizerecords and Universal Music Group. It was later released as a 2-CD limited edition with bonus tracks and videos.

Like the two previous albums, the lyrics of the compositions are stories that all relate to the theme of the album, this time in a post-war mental hospital owned by a man called Dieter Meyer.

History
The first song that was written for the then-untitled third album, "Dieter Meyers Inst.", frontman Janove Ottesen wrote on the pump organ in Café Mono, Oslo. The song is about a man who willingly commits himself to a mental asylum, which set the tone for the overall theme of the album. In January 2004, a 30-track demo was recorded, which the band pitched to various record labels. They eventually landed a contract with Universal Germany.

On 27 February 2004, during a concert at the Rockefeller Music Hall in Oslo, a new song called "Medisin og psykiatri" was played. Also, the song "Tokyo Ice til Clementine" was played once at an acoustic session for the Dutch Pinkpop Festival. Later in 2005, two more new songs, "Delikatessen" and "Maestro", were played at a German musical event called Eine Nacht in Bochum. The event was broadcast on the German radio station 1LIVE. "Medisin og psykiatri" was eventually scrapped from both set lists and the album.

The first single, "Maestro", was changed from its original version to a more hit-friendly style. Some fans claims the track was "popped" after pressure from Universal, but Ottesen has never agreed with that statement. A video for "Maestro" was also recorded in Germany. Before releasing the album, now officially named Maestro, Kaizers released an EP with the same name, featuring the single, the album track "På ditt skift" and two B-sides: "D-dagen" and "Sorti", as well as the "Maestro" video. The release garnered much critical praise and helped to build expectations for the new release.

Maestro was released on 15 August 2005; the record received outstanding reviews from most of the larger newspapers in Norway as well as Scandinavia and other European countries. Shortly thereafter, the Maestro Tour, spanning most of central Europe and later Scandinavia, commenced. At the end of the tour, on 5 and 6 October, the band performed two sold-out shows two nights in a row at the famous Vega concert hall in Copenhagen, Denmark. The last performance was recorded for a future live DVD and album, Viva La Vega and Live at Vega, respectively.

After some time, a 2-CD limited edition of Maestro was released, featuring a bonus CD featuring three previously unreleased tracks. This edition was originally intended to be recalled after the end of their tour, but can still be found in music retailers to this day.

Track listing
Lyrics for all songs are in the Norwegian language. Lyrics and music by Janove Ottesen, unless otherwise noted.
 "KGB"
 "Maestro"
 "Knekker deg til sist" (Break You in the End)
 "Señor Flamingos Adieu" (Instrumental)
 "Blitzregn baby" (Blitz Rain baby)
 "Dieter Meyers Inst." (Dieter Meyer's Institution)
 "Christiania" 
 "Delikatessen" (The Delicatesse)
 "Jævel av en tango" (Hell of a tango)
 "Papa har lov" (Papa Has Permission) (Geir Zahl)
 "Auksjon (i Dieter Meyers hall)" (Auction [In Dieter Meyer's Hall]) (Zahl)
 "På ditt skift" (On Your Shift)

Bonus tracks (Limited edition bonus CD)
 "Action" (Joachim Nielsen)
 "Kalifornia" (Zahl)
 "Tokyo Ice til Clementine" (Tokyo Ice for Clementine)

Also on the second disc of the limited edition are the music videos for "Maestro" and "Knekker Deg til Sist", along with the "Kaizers Orchestra Player", a custom-built music player with downloadable content available.

Personnel
 Janove Ottesen - vocals, producer
 Geir Zahl - guitar
 Terje Winterstø Røthing - guitar
 Øyvind Storesund - double bass
 Rune Solheim - drums
 Helge Risa - pump organ
 Jørgen Træen — producer, mixing
 Bjørn Engelman - mastering
 Paal Audestad — photography
 Atle Øksendal — design
 Gosu Design — design

Guest musicians
 Trifon Trifonov — Saxophone (1, 2)
 Filip Ankov Simeonov — Clarinet (2, 6, 8), Trumpet (2, 6, 8)
 Øyvind Husebø — Trumpet (2, 10)
 Stian Carstensen — Accordion (6, 9), Banjo (9)
 Rebecca Cherry — Violin (6)
 Chiori Suzuki — Violin (6)
 Berend Mulder — Viola (6)
 Siri Hilmen — Cello (6)
 Martin Holmes — Backing vocals (9)
 Tor Erik Hellesen — Trombone (10)
 Gunnar Hågbo — Saxophone (10)

References

Kaizers Orchestra albums
2005 albums